Hitler is a German surname. It is strongly associated with the Nazi leader Adolf Hitler. After World War II, many people born with the surname legally changed their surname. Adolf's family used several varieties of the surname. The form 'Hitler' was relatively new. 

A family unrelated to Adolf Hitler, the Hitler family of Ohio, arrived there in 1799.

Relatives of Adolf Hitler
Eva Braun (1912–1945), or Eva Hitler, wife of Adolf Hitler (marriage April 1945)
Alois Hitler (1837–1903), father
Alois Hitler Jr., half-brother
Angela Hitler (1883–1949), half-sister
Bridget Dowling or Bridget Hitler (1891–1969), sister-in-law
Klara Hitler (1860–1907), mother
Paula Hitler (1896–1960), sister
William Stuart-Houston, born William Patrick Hitler (1911–1987), nephew
Heinz Hitler (1920–1942), nephew

Other people
Adam Hitler, Private of the 16th Massachusetts Infantry Regiment (died 1862)
Adolf Lu Hitler Marak, Indian politician for the Nationalist Congress Party
, Namibian politician and councillor of Ompundja Constituency
Hitler Nababan, Indonesian politician from the Democratic Party
Chenjerai "Hitler" Hunzvi, Zimbabwean nationalist leader
Bing Hitler, early stage name of Scottish comedian Craig Ferguson
E. Hitler, early stage name of Swedish artist Eddie Meduza
Elvis Hitler, stage name of musician Jim Leedy, lead singer of the band Elvis Hitler
Heath Hitler, formerly Isidore Heath Campbell, a white supremacist known for naming his son Adolf Hitler Campbell
Dr. Gay Hitler, dentist from Ohio
Christian Hittler, Private of the 1st Missouri US Reserve Corps Infantry Regiment

Fictional characters
 Gay Hitler, a character on Saturday Night Live
 Edward Elizabeth Hitler, a character in the TV series Bottom
 Vic Hitler, a character in Season 3 of Hill Street Blues
 Bradley Hitler-Smith, a side character in the TV series BoJack Horseman
 Douglas Hitler, a minor character in Season 1 of Happy Endings
 Elle Hitler, a character on Family Guy

See also
Hitler family, relatives and ancestors of Adolf Hitler
Schicklgruber
Gitler (disambiguation)

References

Adolf Hitler